Gem-associated protein 2 (GEMIN2), also called survival of motor neuron protein-interacting protein 1 (SIP1), is a protein that in humans is encoded by the GEMIN2 gene.

Interactions 

Gem-associated protein 2 has been shown to interact with DDX20 and SMN1.

See also 
 Gideon Dreyfuss
 Spinal muscular atrophy

References

Further reading